BTPN Towers are a pair of skyscrapers located at Mega Kuningan in Jakarta, Indonesia. They are part of a mixed use development called the Quadrant Complex.  There are two buildings: The BTPN Office Tower, also known as Menara BTPN, is 223 meters tall and has 48 floors. It was constructed from 2013 to 2016, and serves as the headquarters for Bank BTPN, now part of Sumitomo Mitsui Banking Corporation as well as other businesses. The BTPN Hotel Tower has 25 floors and is under construction.

See also

List of tallest buildings in Indonesia
List of tallest buildings in Jakarta

References

Buildings and structures in Jakarta
Skyscraper office buildings in Indonesia
Post-independence architecture of Indonesia
Buildings and structures completed in 2016
South Jakarta